The 2013 Teen Choice Awards ceremony was held on August 11, 2013, at the Gibson Amphitheatre, Universal City, California. The awards celebrate the year's achievements in music, film, television, sports, fashion, comedy, and the Internet, and are voted on by viewers living in the US, aged 13 and over through various social media sites. This was the last Teen Choice Award ceremony to take place at the Gibson Amphitheatre due to the venue closing down in September 2013, to make room for The Wizarding World of Harry Potter. The Twilight Saga: Breaking Dawn – Part 2 won eight of its nine nominations, Pretty Little Liars won all of its seven nominations, pushing the series' total to eighteen Teen Choice Awards, Pitch Perfect won four of its eleven, Glee won four and Bruno Mars won two of their eight, respectively, Taylor Swift won two of her seven, and Demi Lovato won four of her six, One Direction won all six of their nominations (including the awards received by Harry Styles), remaining undefeated at the Teen Choice Awards, Selena Gomez won three of her six nominations and Miley Cyrus won three of her six nominations. Miley Cyrus took home the "Candie's Fashion Trendsetter" award.

Performers
 One Direction – "Best Song Ever"
 Florida Georgia Line featuring Nelly – "Cruise"
 Demi Lovato with Nick Jonas – "Made in the USA"
 Paramore – "Still Into You"

Presenters
   

 Abigail Breslin
 Alexandra Daddario
 Ashton Kutcher
 Bella Thorne
 Brandon T. Jackson
 Bridgit Mendler
 Chloë Grace Moretz
 Cody Simpson
 Demi Lovato
 Ed Sheeran
 Emblem3
 Erin Andrews
 Fifth Harmony
 Gabby Douglas
 Hailee Steinfeld
 Ian Harding
 Ian Somerhalder
 Janel Parrish
 Kerry Washington
 Laura Marano
 
 Leven Rambin
 Liam Hemsworth
 Lily Collins
 Little Mix
 LL Cool J
 Logan Lerman
 Maia Mitchell
 Max Greenfield
 Miley Cyrus
 Nina Dobrev
 Rebel Wilson
 Ross Lynch
 Russell Westbrook
 Sandra Bullock
 Selena Gomez
 Shay Mitchell
 Simon Helberg
 Skylar Astin
 Tyler Posey

Winners and nominees
The nominees were announced on May 22, 2013, and further nominees were announced on July 1, 2013, and July 16, 2013. Winners are listed first and highlighted in bold text.

Movies

Television

Music

Fashion

Sports

Miscellaneous

Ratings
In its original Fox broadcast on August 11, 2013, the ceremony was viewed by 2.62 million viewers.

References

External links
 Official TCA Website

2013
2013 awards in the United States
2013 in American music
2013 in Los Angeles
August 2013 events in the United States